Ellie Madison Carpenter (born 28 April 2000) is an Australian footballer who plays as a defender for French club Olympique Lyonnais and the Australia national team. She previously played for Western Sydney Wanderers in Australia's W-League and Portland Thorns FC in the United States' National Women's Soccer League (NWSL).

Carpenter made her debut for the Australia national team at the age of 15, the country's first international soccer player – male or female – to be born in the 21st century. She was also the youngest Australian competitor at the Rio 2016 Olympic Games, and the youngest ever female footballer to compete at the Olympics. She made her W-League debut at age 15. In May 2018, she was the youngest player to appear in an NWSL game in league history at age 18.

Carpenter was named the W-League's W-League Young Footballer of the Year three consecutive years from 2018 to 2020.

Early life and education
Born and raised in Cowra, New South Wales, located approximately 400 km west of Sydney, Carpenter lived on a farm with her parents who were both physical education teachers  Growing up, Carpenter regularly undertook extended travels to play football in Young, Canberra and Sydney. At age 12, her family moved to Sydney so she could attend Westfields Sports High School. She attended both Cowra and Mulyan Public Schools. At age 17, she dropped out of school to pursue her athletic career full-time.

Club career

2015–2016: Western Sydney Wanderers FC 
Carpenter joined Western Sydney Wanderers in September 2015. During the 2015–16 W-League season, she was a starting defender in all twelve games that she played. The Wanderers finished in seventh place during the regular season with a  record. Her performance during her inaugural season earned her a call-up to a training camp with the Matildas in November 2015. Despite being only 15, she was a versatile right back defender who often helped out in offensive plays overlapping and serving crosses to her teammates.

2017–2018: Canberra United FC 

In August 2017, Carpenter signed with Canberra United for the 2017–18 W-League season. Carpenter was a starting defender in 10 of the 11 games she played and scored 2 goals. She scored her first goal during the team's 6–1 win over Adelaide United on 7 January 2018. Her next goal was the Wanderers' lone goal during a 5–1 loss to Newcastle Jets on 28 January. Canberra finished in fifth place during the regular season with a  record. Following the season, she was awarded the league's Young Footballer of the Year.

During the 2018–19 season, Carpenter scored a goal during the team's season-opening 2–0 win over Melbourne City. She scored her second goal of the season during a 2–2 draw against her former team, Western Sydney Wanderers on 7 December 2018. The goal was considered controversial as the Wanderers goalkeeper was down injured. Canberra finished in eighth place with a  record. Carpenter was named Young Footballer of the Year for the second consecutive time.

In September 2019, Carpenter announced she would be leaving Canberra for another W-League team after returning from playing with the Portland Thorns during the 2019 NWSL season. She noted, "I'm off to find a new challenge and to experience new things. My time in green will always be memorable."

2018–2020: Portland Thorns 

Carpenter became the youngest player in NWSL history when she made her debut for the Portland Thorns FC on 9 May 2018. Ten days later, she became the youngest scorer in league history after netting the game-winning goal against the Washington Spirit 22 days after her 18th birthday. Carpenter was a starting defender in 16 of the 19 games she played during the 2018 season and scored one goal. Portland finished in second place during the regular season and advanced to the NWSL Playoffs. After defeating Reign FC 2–1 during the semifinals, Portland was defeated 3–0 by the North Carolina Courage in the Final.

Carpenter was a starting defender in 16 of the 19 games she played in during the 2019 NWSL season. Portland finished in third place during the regular season and advanced to the Playoffs where they were defeated by Chicago Red Stars 1–0 in the semifinals.

2019–2020: Melbourne City FC (loan) 
In October 2019, Carpenter joined Melbourne City on a one-season loan. She was a starting defender in all 14 matches and scored two goals. On 20 February 2020, Carpenter scored a brace against her former team, Western Sydney Wanderers, lifting Melbourne to a 4–0 win and the league premiership. After advancing to the Final Stages, Carpenter helped Melbourne City win the Grand Final shutting out Sydney FC 1–0. Carpenter was named Young Footballer of the Year award for the third consecutive time in July 2020.

2020–present: Olympique Lyonnais 
In June 2020, the Thorns announced the transfer of Carpenter to Olympique Lyonnais,. On 3 July, she signed a contract that extends to 2023. On 14 August 2020, she made her first appearance for the French club in a 4-0 friendly victory over PSV Eindhoven and provided an assist for Nikita Parris.
Carpenter was an unused sub in the Champions League final win against Wolfsburg. She won her second Champions League in 2022, with her club beat Barcelona 3–1, though she was forced to be substituted in just over 20 minutes due to an injury.

On 28 June 2022, Olympique Lyonnais extended their contract with Carpenter until 30 June 2026.

International career

Carpenter has represented Australia on the senior national team (commonly referred to as the Matildas) as well as the under-17, and under-20 national teams.
At the age of 14, Carpenter was first called up to the under-17 team for 2015 AFC U-16 Women's Championship qualification in September 2014. She made her debut for the under-17 team in a win over Vietnam, playing a full match in the first game of qualification.

At the age of 15, Carpenter earned her first cap for the senior national team in a 9–0 win against Vietnam on 2 March 2016 during the Olympic Qualifiers. Her appearance marked the first Australian international (women's or men's) born since 2000. Of the game, she stated, "It was an amazing experience. In some ways keeping my concentration was quite difficult, but I felt like I kept my composure and did well."

In July 2016, Carpenter was named to the Matildas squad for the 2016 Rio Olympics. At age 16, Carpenter was the youngest Australian competitor at the 2016 Rio Olympics and the youngest-ever woman footballer to compete at the Olympics. After finishing third in their Group and finishing first in the group of third place teams, the Matildas were defeated by Brazil during an intense penalty kick shootout in the quarterfinals.

In 2017, Carpenter competed with the Matildas at the Tournament of Nations in the United States. The Australians won the tournament after a 6–1 win over Brazil. During the 28th minute of a match against the United States, Carpenter was hit directly in the face by a ball being cleared by American defender Crystal Dunn. Carpenter dropped to the ground and was later taken off the field by medical staff. Playing with gauze up her bleeding nose, she returned to the field to help the Matildas secure a 1–1 draw against the 2015 FIFA Women's World Cup champions.

In February 2019, Carpenter was named to the Matildas squad for the inaugural FFA Cup of Nations. Carpenter helped the Matildas win the Cup.

At age 19, Carpenter made her World Cup debut at the 2019 FIFA Women's World Cup in France during the team's first Group Stage match: a 2–1 loss to Italy. The team turned it around during their second Group Stage match: a 3–2 win over Brazil, becoming only the second team in tournament history to win after a two-goal deficit. After finishing second in their group after a 4–1 over Jamaica, the Matildas advanced to the Round of 16 where they faced Norway where they lost in penalty kicks.

Carpenter was a member of the Matildas Tokyo 2020 Olympics squad. The Matildas qualified for the quarter-finals and beat Great Britain before being eliminated in the semi-final with Sweden. In the playoff for the Bronze medal they were beaten by the USA.

Personal life
Carpenter is currently in a relationship with Dutch footballer and Olympique Lyonnais teammate Daniëlle van de Donk.

Career statistics

Club 

1Coupe de France
2UEFA Women's Champions League

International

Scores and results list Australia's goal tally first, score column indicates score after each Carpenter goal.

Honours

Club 
Melbourne City

 W-League Premiership: 2019-20
 W-League Championship: 2020

Olympique Lyonnais
 Division 1 Féminine: 2021-22
 Coupe de France féminine: 2020
 UEFA Women's Champions League: 2019-20, 2021-22

International 
Australia
 Tournament of Nations: 2017
 FFA Cup of Nations: 2019

Individual
 IFFHS AFC Woman Team of the Decade 2011–2020
 W-League Young Footballer of the Year: 2017–18, 2018–19, 2019–20
PFA Women's Footballer of the Year

References

Further reading 
 Grainey, Timothy (2012), Beyond Bend It Like Beckham: The Global Phenomenon of Women's Soccer, University of Nebraska Press, 
 Stay, Shane (2019), The Women's World Cup 2019 Book: Everything You Need to Know About the Soccer World Cup, Books on Demand, 
 Stead, Emily (2020), The Ultimate Guide to Women's Football, Scholastic, 
 Theivam, Keiran and Jeff Kassouf (2019), The Making of the Women's World Cup: Defining stories from a sport's coming of age, Little, 
 Williams, Jean (2007), A Beautiful Game: International Perspectives on Women's Football , A&C Black,

External links

 
 Profile at Olympique Lyonnais
 
 
 

2000 births
Living people
Australian women's soccer players
Women's association football fullbacks
Footballers at the 2016 Summer Olympics
Western Sydney Wanderers FC (A-League Women) players
Canberra United FC players
Portland Thorns FC players
Melbourne City FC (A-League Women) players
Women's association football defenders
Olympic soccer players of Australia
Sportswomen from New South Wales
Soccer players from New South Wales
Australia women's international soccer players
People from Cowra
National Women's Soccer League players
2019 FIFA Women's World Cup players
People educated at Westfields Sports High School
Footballers at the 2020 Summer Olympics
Olympique Lyonnais Féminin players
Division 1 Féminine players
Australian expatriate sportspeople in France
Expatriate women's footballers in France
Australian expatriate women's soccer players
Australian expatriate sportspeople in the United States
Expatriate women's soccer players in the United States
Association footballers' wives and girlfriends